Cistecephaloides is an extinct genus of dicynodont therapsids of the Cistecephalus Assemblage Zone, Beaufort Group of South Africa.

See also 

 List of therapsids

References

External links 
 The main groups of non-mammalian synapsids at Mikko's Phylogeny Archive

Dicynodonts
Lopingian synapsids of Africa
Permian South Africa
Fossils of South Africa
Beaufort Group
Fossil taxa described in 1974
Anomodont genera